Xanthetis is a monotypic moth genus in the family Erebidae erected by George Hampson in 1900. Its single species, Xanthetis luzonica, was first described by Felder in 1875. It is found in the Philippines.

References

Nudariina
Monotypic moth genera
Moths described in 1875